Some sources have alleged that the Central Intelligence Agency (CIA) had ties with Osama Bin Laden's al-Qaeda and its "Afghan Arab" fighters when it armed Mujahideen groups to fight the Soviet Union during the Soviet–Afghan War.

About the same time as the Soviet invasion of Afghanistan, the United States began collaborating with Pakistan's Inter-Services Intelligence (ISI) to provide several hundred million dollars a year in aid to the Afghan Mujahideen insurgents fighting the Afghan pro-Soviet government and the Soviet Army in Operation Cyclone. Along with native Afghan mujahideen were Muslim volunteers from other countries, popularly known as "Afghan Arabs". The most famous of the Afghan Arabs was Osama bin Laden, known at the time as a wealthy and pious Saudi who provided his own money and helped raise millions from other wealthy Gulf Arabs.

When the war ended, bin Laden organized the al-Qaeda organization to carry on armed jihad against other countries, primarily against the United States.

A number of commentators have described Al-Qaeda attacks as "blowback" or an unintended consequence of American aid to the mujahideen. In response, the United States government and American and Pakistani intelligence officials involved in the operation have denied this theory. Many journalists, including CNN's Peter Bergen, have also denied the claim. They maintain the aid was given out by the Pakistani government, that it went to Afghan and not foreign mujahideen, and that there was no contact between the Afghan Arabs (foreign mujahideen) and the CIA and other American officials, let alone the arming, training, coaching, or indoctrination.

As of 2018, there is no publicly available documentary evidence to support any of the claims regarding collaboration between U.S. government agencies and bin Laden.

Allegations
In a 2004 article entitled "Al-Qaeda's origins and links", the BBC wrote:

During the anti-Soviet war Bin Laden and his fighters received American and Saudi funding. Some analysts believe Bin Laden himself had security training from the CIA.

Robin Cook, Foreign Secretary in the UK from 1997 to 2001, believed the CIA had provided arms to the Arab mujahideen, including Osama bin Laden, writing, "Bin Laden was, though, a product of a monumental miscalculation by western security agencies. Throughout the '80s he was armed by the CIA and funded by the Saudis to wage war against the Russian occupation of Afghanistan."

In conversation with former British Defence Secretary Michael Portillo, two-time prime minister of Pakistan Benazir Bhutto said Osama bin Laden was initially pro-American. Prince Bandar bin Sultan of Saudi Arabia, has also stated that bin Laden once expressed appreciation for the United States' help in Afghanistan. On CNN's Larry King program he said:

Bandar bin Sultan: This is ironic. In the mid-'80s, if you remember, we and the United - Saudi Arabia and the United States were supporting the Mujahideen to liberate Afghanistan from the Soviets. He [Osama bin Laden] came to thank me for my efforts to bring the Americans, our friends, to help us against the atheists, he said the communists. Isn't it ironic?

Larry King: How ironic. In other words, he came to thank you for helping bring America to help him.

Bandar bin Sultan: Right.

Opposing view

U.S. government officials and a number of other parties maintain that the U.S. supported only the indigenous Afghan mujahideen. They deny that the CIA or other American officials had contact with Bin Laden, let alone armed, trained, coached, or indoctrinated him. American scholars and reporters have called the idea of a CIA-backed Al Qaeda "nonsense", "sheer fantasy", and a "common myth".

According to Peter Jouvenal, Americans could not train mujahideen because Pakistani officials would not allow more than a handful of U.S. agents to operate in Pakistan and none in Afghanistan.

The former Al-Qaeda leader Ayman al-Zawahiri says much the same thing in his book Knights Under the Prophet's Banner.

Bin Laden himself once said "The collapse of the Soviet Union ... goes to God and the mujahideen in Afghanistan ... the US had no mentionable role," but "collapse made the US more haughty and arrogant."

In Ghost Wars (2004), Steve Coll recounted: "Bin Laden moved within Saudi intelligence's compartmented operations, outside of CIA eyesight. CIA archives contain no record of any direct contact between a CIA officer and bin Laden during the 1980s." Yet Coll also documents that bin Laden at least informally cooperated with the ISI during the 1980s and had intimate connections to CIA-backed mujahideen commander Jalaluddin Haqqani; Milton Bearden, the CIA's Islamabad station chief from mid-1986 until mid-1989, took an admiring view of bin Laden at the time. Afghan assets recounted the fanaticism and intolerance of many of the so-called "Afghan Arabs" to the CIA, yet the CIA discounted these reports, instead contemplating direct support to the Arab volunteers under the guise of a Spanish Civil War-inspired "international brigade"—a concept that never got off paper.

According to Norwegian researcher Thomas Hegghammer, the book Unholy Wars by journalist John K. Cooley did the most to propagate the view that the CIA trained the Afghan Arabs. In this book, Cooley described “the central role of the CIA’s Muslim mercenaries, including upwards of 2,000 Algerians, in the Afghanistan war”. He did not present any evidence for his claims, though. And according to historian Odd Arne Westad, his book is unreliable. Based on information by Soviet defector Vasili Mitrokhin, parts of the book “obviously originate in Soviet disinformation from the 1980s”.

According to CNN journalist Peter Bergen, known for conducting the first television interview with Osama bin Laden in 1997, "Bin Laden had his own money, he was anti-American, and he was operating secretly and independently."

Bergen quotes Pakistani Brigadier Mohammad Yousaf, who ran the Inter-Services Intelligence (ISI) Afghan operation between 1983 and 1987:
It was always galling to the Americans, and I can understand their point of view, that although they paid the piper they could not call the tune. The CIA supported the mujahideen by spending the taxpayers' money, billions of dollars of it over the years, on buying arms, ammunition, and equipment. It was their secret arms procurement branch that was kept busy. It was, however, a cardinal rule of Pakistan's policy that no Americans ever become involved with the distribution of funds or arms once they arrived in the country. No Americans ever trained or had direct contact with the mujahideen, and no American official ever went inside Afghanistan.

Marc Sageman, a Foreign Service Officer who was based in Islamabad from 1987 to 1989, and worked closely with Afghanistan's Mujahideen, states that no American money went to the foreign volunteers.

Sageman also says:
 Contemporaneous accounts of the war do not even mention [the Afghan Arabs]. Many were not serious about the war. ... Very few were involved in actual fighting. For most of the war, they were scattered among the Afghan groups associated with the four Afghan fundamentalist parties.

No U.S. official ever came in contact with the foreign volunteers. They simply traveled in different circles and never crossed U.S. radar screens. They had their own sources of money and their own contacts with the Pakistanis, official Saudis, and other Muslim supporters, and they made their own deals with the various Afghan resistance leaders."

As Peter Beinart writes in an October, 2001 article in The New Republic arguing against blowback as a cause for the 9/11 attacks:

As Vincent Cannistraro, who led the Reagan administration's Afghan Working Group from 1985 to 1987, puts it, "The CIA was very reluctant to be involved at all. They thought it would end up with them being blamed, like in Guatemala." So the Agency tried to avoid direct involvement in the war, ... the skittish CIA, Cannistraro estimates, had less than ten operatives acting as America's eyes and ears in the region. Milton Bearden, the Agency's chief field operative in the war effort, has insisted that "[T]he CIA had nothing to do with" bin Laden. Cannistraro says that when he coordinated Afghan policy from Washington, he never once heard bin Laden's name.

Fox News reporter Richard Miniter wrote that in interviews with the two men who "oversaw the disbursement for all American funds to the anti-Soviet resistance, Bill Peikney—CIA station chief in Islamabad from 1984 to 1986—and Milt Bearden—CIA station chief from 1986 to 1989—he found,
Both flatly denied that any CIA funds ever went to bin Laden. They felt so strongly about this point that they agreed to go on the record, an unusual move by normally reticent intelligence officers. Mr. Peikney added in an e-mail to me: “I don’t even recall UBL [bin Laden] coming across my screen when I was there.

Other reasons advanced for a lack of a CIA-Afghan Arab connection of "pivotal importance," (or even any connection at all), was that the Afghan Arabs themselves were not important in the war but were a "curious sideshow to the real fighting."

One estimate of the number of combatants in the war is that 250,000 Afghans fought 125,000 Soviet troops, but only 2000 Arab Afghans fought "at any one time".

According to Bearden, the CIA did not recruit Arabs because there were hundreds of thousands of Afghans all too willing to fight. The Arab Afghans were not only superfluous but "disruptive," angering local Afghans with their more-Muslim-than-thou attitude, according to Peter Jouvenal. Veteran Afghan cameraman Peter Jouvenal quotes an Afghan mujahideen as saying "whenever we had a problem with one of them [foreign mujahideen], we just shot them. They thought they were kings."

Many who traveled in Afghanistan, including Olivier Roy and Peter Jouvenal, reported of the Arab Afghans' visceral hostility to Westerners in Afghanistan to aid Afghans or report on their plight. BBC reporter John Simpson tells the story of running into Osama bin Laden in 1989, and with neither knowing who the other was, bin Laden attempting to bribe Simpson's Afghan driver $500—a large sum in a poor country—to kill the infidel Simpson. When the driver declined, Bin Laden retired to his "camp bed" and wept "in frustration."

Academic historian Paul Thomas Chamberlin wrote in 2018 that "[t]o date, no researcher has produced documentation of direct links between Washington and bin Laden or, for that matter, Zarqawi. The weight of evidence suggests that the CIA and the future leaders of Al-Qaeda and ISIS were not in communication with one another during the Soviet occupation in Afghanistan."

Agreements
Sir Martin Ewans stated that the Afghan Arabs "benefited indirectly from the CIA's funding, through the ISI and resistance organizations," and that "it has been reckoned that as many as 35,000 'Arab-Afghans' may have received military training in Pakistan at an estimated cost of $800 million in the years up to and including 1988."

Some of the CIA's greatest Afghan beneficiaries were Arabist commanders such as Haqqani and Gulbuddin Hekmatyar who were key allies of Bin Laden over many years. Haqqani—one of Bin Laden's closest associates in the 1980s—received direct cash payments from CIA agents, without the mediation of the ISI. This independent source of funding gave Haqqani disproportionate influence over the mujahideen, and helped Bin Laden develop his base.

Sheik Omar Abdel Rahman, an associate of Bin Laden's, was given visas to enter the US on four occasions by the CIA. Rahman was recruiting Arabs to fight in the Soviet-Afghan war, and Egyptian officials testified that the CIA actively assisted him. Rahman was a co-plotter of the 1993 World Trade Center bombing.
 
One allegation not denied by the US government is that the U.S. Army enlisted and trained a former Egyptian soldier named Ali Mohamed, and that it knew Ali occasionally took trips to Afghanistan, where he claimed to fight Russians. According to journalist Lawrence Wright, who interviewed U.S. officials about Ali, the Egyptian did tell his Army superiors he was fighting in Afghanistan, but did not tell them he was training other Afghan Arabs or writing a manual from what he had learned from the US Army Special Forces. Wright also reports that the CIA failed to inform other US agencies that it had learned Ali, who was a member of Egyptian Islamic Jihad, was an anti-American spy.

See also
Bank of Credit and Commerce International
CIA activities in Afghanistan
Operation Cyclone
United States and state-sponsored terrorism
Charlie Wilson's War: The Extraordinary Story of the Largest Covert Operation in History

References

Allegations
CIA activities in Asia
Osama bin Laden
Soviet–Afghan War
CIA and Islamism